Farm to Market Roads in Texas are owned and maintained by the Texas Department of Transportation (TxDOT).

FM 2500

FM 2501

FM 2502

FM 2503

Farm to Market Road 2503 (FM 2503) is located in Fayette County. It runs from SH 71 in Ellinger to FM 1291 southeast of Fayetteville.

FM 2503 was designated on October 31, 1957, along its current route.

FM 2504

FM 2505

FM 2506

FM 2507

FM 2508

FM 2509

FM 2510

FM 2511

FM 2512

FM 2513

Farm to Market Road 2513 (FM 2513) was located in Brazos County. No highway currently uses the FM 2513 designation.

FM 2513 was cancelled and removed from the state highway system on December 14, 1989, with maintenance being turned over to the city of Bryan.

FM 2514

Farm to Market Road 2514 (FM 2514) is located in Collin County.

The western terminus of FM 2514 is at the Plano–Parker city line; the continuation into Plano is known appropriately as Parker Road. The route travels east through Parker and Saint Paul before turning southward into Wylie. The route ends at  SH 78 in central Wylie.

An unrelated route numbered FM 2514 was designation on October 31, 1957, in Robertson County from FM 2293 5 miles north of Owensville northeast to SH 7. That mileage was canceled on December 31, 1959, and transferred to FM 979.

The current FM 2514 was designated from Plano to Parker on September 25, 1960, from  SH 5 (the old routing of  US 75) to  FM 2551. It was extended to Wylie, to an intersection with  FM 544 (later FM 3412), on June 1, 1965. The western terminus was truncated to the Plano city limits on October 28, 1987, when SH 5 and other state-maintained highways were removed from the highway system and returned to the city of Plano's jurisdiction. On June 27, 1995, the entire route was redesignated Urban Road 2514 (UR 2514). The route in Wylie was extended to SH 78 on May 28, 2009, replacing FM 3412 (which the section from FM 1378 to FM 2514 was given to the city of Wylie on November 20, 2008). On March 27, 2014, the section from Brown Street (former FM 3412) to SH 78 was removed from the state highway system. The designation of the route reverted to FM 2514 with the elimination of the Urban Road system on November 15, 2018.
Junction list

FM 2514 (1957)

The original FM 2514 was designated on October 31, 1957, from FM 2293, 5 miles north of Owensville, northeast  via Bald Prairie to SH 7. FM 2514 was cancelled on December 30, 1959, and transferred to FM 979.

FM 2515

FM 2516

FM 2517

FM 2518

FM 2519

Farm to Market Road 2519 (FM 2519) is located in Brownsville.

FM 2519 begins at SH 4 in central Brownsville. It travels to the south and east along Billy Mitchell Boulevard before state maintenance ends at the entrance to Brownsville/South Padre Island International Airport.

FM 2519 was designated on October 31, 1957, along its current route. On June 27, 1995, the entire route was redesignated Urban Road 2519 (UR 2519). The designation reverted to FM 2519 with the elimination of the Urban Road system on November 15, 2018.

FM 2520

FM 2521

FM 2522

RM 2523

Ranch to Market Road 2523 (RM 2523) is located in Val Verde, Kinney, and Edwards counties.

RM 2523 begins at an intersection with US 90 in eastern Del Rio. Just north of the intersection with US 90, the highway travels through Val Verde Park and leaves the town right before an intersection with Loop 79. Outside of the Del Rio area, RM 2523 travels through largely rural areas, with the terrain becoming more hilly the farther north the highway travels. RM 2523 ends at an intersection with US 377 northeast of Carta Valley.

The highway was extended  northeastward on October 31, 1958. RM 2523 was extended  northeastward on November 24, 1959. The highway was extended  northward on September 27, 1960. RM 2523 was extended  to US 377 on June 20, 1961.

Junction list

FM 2524

FM 2525

FM 2526

Farm to Market Road 2526 (FM 2526) is located in Eastland County.

FM 2526 begins at an intersection with FM 569 at Nimrod. The highway travels in an eastern direction and intersects SH 206 and has a brief overlap with US 183. After the overlap, FM 2526 continues to travel in an eastern direction and enters the town of Carbon, where it intersects SH 6. The highway ends at an intersection with FM 2689.

The highway was extended  westward to FM 569 on October 31, 1958. FM 2526 was extended  eastward to FM 2689 on May 6, 1964.

Junction list

FM 2527

Farm to Market Road 2527 (FM 2527) is located in Lampasas County.

FM 2527 begins at an intersection with FM 580 near Rumley. The highway runs in a slight northwest direction and runs parallel to the Lampasas River for its entire route. FM 2527 ends at an intersection with FM 1690.

The highway was extended to FM 1690 on October 31, 1958.

FM 2528

Farm to Market Road 2528 (FM 2528) is located in the Lubbock metropolitan area.

FM 2528 begins at Loop 289 in west Lubbock. The highway runs north along Frankford Avenue and has an intersection with FM 2255 (4th Street) near a major retail center. Development along the highway begins to lower after an intersection with Erskine Street before leaving the city limits of Lubbock. Shortly after leaving Lubbock, FM 2528 has an intersection with US 84 and FM 2641 shortly after that. The highway travels through sparsely populated areas of Lubbock County and overlaps with FM 597 between Anton and Abernathy. After leaving FM 597, FM 2528 enters Lamb County and ends at an intersection with FM 54 southeast of Spade.

FM 2528 was first designated on October 31, 1958, from FM 597 south to FM 1729 west of New Deal. On June 28, 1963, the highway was extended south to Loop 289 in Lubbock. On November 5, 1971, FM 2528 was extended north to FM 54, overlapping with FM 597 in the process. On June 27, 1995, the section from Loop 289 to US 84 was redesignated Urban Road 2528 (UR 2528). The designation of this section reverted to FM 2528 with the elimination of the Urban Road system on November 15, 2018.

Junction list

RM 2528

RM 2528 was designated on October 31, 1957, from US 80 (now I-10) at Sierra Blanca southward  to a road intersection. This was cancelled on December 6, 1957, and mileage was transferred to RM 1111.

FM 2529

Farm to Market Road 2529 (FM 2529) is located in El Paso County within the city of El Paso.

FM 2529 begins at an intersection with Bus. US 54 (Dyer Street) near Fort Bliss. The highway travels in a northern direction along McCombs Street through an area of the city with a mix of residential and commercial development. North of US 54, FM 2529 travels through more rural areas of the city's north side. The highway turns west onto Stan Roberts Sr. Avenue, running one mile south of the New Mexico state line, before ending at an intersection with FM 3255 (Martin Luther King Jr. Boulevard).

FM 2529 was designated on October 31, 1957, traveling from US 54 (now Bus. The highway was extended  westward to Dona Ana Target Range Road on October 31, 1958. The section of FM 2529 between FM 2637 and FM 3255 was relocated on November 29, 1982 (the old route is now State Line Drive). On June 27, 1995, the entire route was redesignated Urban Road 2529 (UR 2529). The designation reverted to FM 2529 with the elimination of the Urban Road system on November 15, 2018.

Junction list

FM 2530

FM 2531

FM 2532

FM 2533

FM 2534

FM 2535

FM 2535 (1957)

The original FM 2535 was designated on October 31, 1957, from US 82 near the Montague County line, north  to a road intersection. FM 2535 was cancelled on October 30, 1960, and transferred to FM 2332.

FM 2536

Farm to Market Road 2536 (FM 2536) is located in Bexar County.

FM 2536 begins at an intersection with Loop 1604 southwest of San Antonio. The highway travels in a northeast direction through more rural areas of the county and enters San Antonio near an intersection with Nelson Road. FM 2536 continues to travel through less developed areas and runs near a large residential area of the city after a junction with I-410 / SH 16. The highway travels along the edge of Pearsall Park before ending at an intersection with Loop 13 near Lackland AFB. FM 2536 in San Antonio is known locally as Old Pearsall Road.

FM 2536 was designated on April 24, 1958, traveling from Loop 13 southwestward to FM 2173 (which has since been decommissioned). The highway was extended to FM 1604 (now Loop 1604) on November 3, 1972 (FM 2173 was cancelled less than a year later). On June 27, 1995, the section between I-410 and Loop 13 was redesignated Urban Road 2536 (UR 2536). This section was proposed for decommissioning in 2014 as part of TxDOT's San Antonio turnback proposal, which would have turned back over 129 miles of roads to the city of San Antonio, but the city of San Antonio rejected that proposal. The designation of this section reverted to FM 2536 with the elimination of the Urban Road system on November 15, 2018.

Junction list

FM 2537

Farm to Market Road 2537 (FM 2537) is located in Bexar County.

FM 2537 begins at an intersection with Pleasanton Road south of San Antonio. The highway travels in a southeast direction through rural farm areas before ending at an intersection with US 281 near Southside High School.

FM 2537 was designated on April 24, 1958, along the current route.

FM 2538

Farm to Market Road 2538 (FM 2538) is located in Bexar and Guadalupe counties.

FM 2538 begins at a junction with I-10/US 90/SH 130 near Zuehl. The highway travels in a southeast direction near Cibolo Creek and the Zuehl city limits until an intersection with Real Rock Road, running near several farms and guest ranches. FM 2538 crosses the creek and enters New Berlin, where it ends at an intersection with FM 775.

The highway was extended  from Cibolo Creek to FM 775 on October 31 of that year.

FM 2539

FM 2540

FM 2541

FM 2541 (1958)

The original FM 2541 was designated on October 31, 1958, from FM 457 north of Sargent, northeast  to the Brazoria County line at Cedar Lake. FM 2541 was cancelled on May 29, 1962, and transferred to FM 2611.

FM 2542

FM 2543

FM 2544

FM 2544 (1958)

The original FM 2544 was designated on October 31, 1958, from US 87 near Kamey northeast  to a county road. FM 2544 was cancelled on September 20, 1961, and removed from the highway system in exchange for the creation of FM 2717.

RM 2545

FM 2545 (1958)

The first use of the FM 2545 designation was in Victoria County, from FM 1686, 7 miles northeast of Dacosta, northeast  to a road intersection. On May 2, 1962, the road was extended northeast  to FM 444. FM 2545 was cancelled on May 25, 1962, and transferred to FM 444.

FM 2545 (1963)

The second use of the FM 2545 designation was in Houston County, from SH 7 in Kennard south  towards Pennington. FM 2545 was cancelled on October 14, 1964, and transferred to FM 2781.

FM 2545 (1965)

The third use of the FM 2545 designation was in Tarrant County, from SH 114/Spur 103 south  to a point near a road intersection. FM 2545 was cancelled on November 26, 1969, and removed from the highway system.

FM 2546

Farm to Market Road 2546 (FM 2546) is located in Wharton County. It runs from near the Mount Pilgrim Baptist Church to SH 71 north of El Campo.

FM 2546 begins in front of Mount Pilgrim Baptist Church. From here, CR 394 continues west and CR 379 goes north. The route runs east, intersecting FM 1160 at Hahn, before passing the Hahn Cemetery. It then has an intersection with SH 71 before passing through the community of Jones Creek. The route curves back to the southwest, intersecting FM 2765, before ending at another intersection with SH 71. The continuation of the road on the west side of SH 71 is called Sandy Corners Road.

FM 2546 was designated on October 31, 1958, beginning at FM 1160 and running approximately  eastward to a point on SH 71 southeast of New Taiton. On May 2, 1962, the highway was extended west from FM 1160 . FM 2923 was canceled on May 18, 1966.

Junction list

FM 2547

FM 2548

FM 2549

FM 2550

FM 2551

Farm to Market Road 2551 (FM 2551) is located in Collin County.

FM 2551 begins at FM 544 in Murphy. It travels north along Murphy Road into Parker, where it intersects FM 2514. The two routes are briefly concurrent along Parker Road before FM 2551 turns to the north along Dillehay Drive. The route enters Allen, where it is known as Angel Parkway, before ending at FM 2170 near the Lucas city limits.

The highway was extended  to FM 544 in Murphy on June 25, 1962. On June 27, 1995, the entire route was redesignated Urban Road 2551 (UR 2551). The designation reverted to FM 2551 with the elimination of the Urban Road system on November 15, 2018. On February 28, 2019, the section of FM 2551 from FM 544 to the Murphy city limits border was cancelled and given to the city of Murphy.

Junction list

FM 2552

Farm to Market Road 2552 (FM 2552) is located in Parker County in Weatherford.

FM 2552 begins at a junction with I-20 and Clear Lake Road. The highway travels briefly along Clear Lake Road before traveling along Santa Fe Drive in a northwestern direction before turning west near Briarhaven Boulevard, then turns north near Park Avenue. FM 2552 turns off of Santa Fe Drive onto Jack Borden Way at an intersection. The highway travels along Jack Borden Way through the Town Creek greenbelt before ending at an intersection with US 180.

The current FM 2552 was designated on February 29, 1968, traveling from US 80 (now US 180) southeastward to I-20. The highway was re-routed onto to Jack Borden Way near the town square in 2016 as part of the city's plan to alleviate vehicle traffic in the area.

FM 2552 (1958)

The highway was cancelled on October 3, 1966, when SH 98 was rerouted. The old route of SH 98 east of FM 1840 became part of FM 1840.

FM 2553

Farm to Market Road 2553 (FM 2553) is located in Harris County in southeastern Houston.

FM 2553 begins at I-45 near the Sam Houston Tollway. The highway travels in a northeastern direction as a mostly two-lane undivided highway along Scarsdale Road. FM 2553 travels through a rural, undeveloped area of the city, before traveling near a subdivision and ending at an intersection with SH 3.

The current FM 2553 was designated on July 29, 1965, running from I-45 northeastward to SH 3. On June 27, 1995, the entire route was redesignated Urban Road 2553 (UR 2553). The designation reverted to FM 2553 with the elimination of the Urban Road system on November 15, 2018.

FM 2553 (1958)

The highway was cancelled and combined with FM 990 on June 10, 1965.

FM 2554

FM 2554 (1958)

The original FM 2554 was designated from FM 134 southeast of Karnack west to SH 43. FM 2554 was cancelled in 1959 and was removed from the state highway system.

FM 2555

Farm to Market Road 2555 (FM 2555) is located in Navarro County.

FM 2555 begins at an intersection with FM 709 in the town of Retreat. The highway travels in a northwestern direction, then turns in a more northern direction at Oak Valley. FM 2555 enters Corsicana near an intersection with Oak Valley Road then intersects SH 31 near a commercial area. The highway intersects FM 744 near Corsicana High School before ending at an intersection with SH 22. The section of FM 2555 within Corsicana is known locally as 45th Street.

The highway was extended  southward to FM 709 on October 21, 1981.

Junction list

FM 2555 (1958)

The highway was cancelled on December 18, 1959, with the mileage being transferred to FM 1011.

FM 2556

FM 2557

FM 2557 (1958)

FM 2557 was cancelled on June 21, 1967, and became a portion of RM 187.

FM 2558

FM 2558 (1958)

The original FM 2558 was designated on October 31, 1958, from SH 85, 7 miles east of Carrizo Springs, southeast  to FM 190. FM 2558 was cancelled on January 31, 1961, and removed from the highway system by request of court officials in exchange for extending FM 2688.

FM 2559

FM 2560

FM 2560 (1958)

The original FM 2560 was designated on October 31, 1958, from SH 206, 1 mile east of Echo, east  to the Brown County line. FM 2560 was cancelled on May 24, 1962, and transferred to FM 585.

FM 2561

FM 2562

FM 2562 (1958)

The original FM 2562 was designated on October 31, 1958, from FM 268, 1.1 miles north of US 287, to a point . FM 2562 was cancelled on February 20, 1970, and became a portion of FM 2530.

FM 2563

FM 2564

FM 2565

FM 2566

FM 2567

FM 2567 (1958)

FM 2567 was cancelled on October 9, 1961, and transferred to FM 268.

FM 2568

FM 2569

FM 2570

FM 2570 (1958)

The original FM 2570 was designated on October 31, 1958, from SH 283, 1 mile south of the Brazos River, east  to a road intersection. FM 2570 was cancelled on June 21, 1967, and became a portion of FM 2534.

FM 2571

RM 2571

FM 2572

FM 2572 (1958)

The original FM 2572 was designated on October 31, 1958, from FM 359 at Pattison west  to the Brazos River. FM 2572 was cancelled on September 11, 1968, and became a portion of FM 1458.

FM 2573

FM 2574

FM 2575

Farm to Market Road 2575 (FM 2575) is located in the Amarillo area.

FM 2575 runs along SE 8th Avenue east of Amarillo. The western terminus is in Potter County at FM 1912. The eastern terminus is in Carson County at a junction with I-40 and Business I-40.

FM 2575 was designated on December 19, 1958, on its current route. Prior to the building of Amarillo International Airport, the roadway was an alignment of US 66.

FM 2576

Farm to Market Road 2576 (FM 2576) is located in Crosby County.

The southern terminus of FM 2576 is at an intersection with  near the unincorporated community of Savage.

The current designation was established on May 2, 1962.

FM 2576 (1958)

A previous route designed FM 2576 was designated in Jasper County on December 19, 1958, southward  from an intersection with FM 105. On November 24, 1959, the route was extended southward . This route became a part of FM 1131 on October 16, 1961.

FM 2577

FM 2578

FM 2579

FM 2580

FM 2581

FM 2582

FM 2583

FM 2584

FM 2585

FM 2586

Farm to Market Road 2586 (FM 2586) is located in Dallam County. It runs northward, passing west of the Rita Blanca National Grassland, to the Oklahoma state line. The roadway continues under Cimarron County maintenance to US 412.

FM 2586 was designated on November 24, 1959, from FM 296 northward . It was extended to the Oklahoma state line on February 5, 1960.

FM 2587

RM 2588

Ranch to Market Road 2588 (RM 2588) is located in Henderson County.

The RM 2588 designation begins in southern Henderson County, just north of the Anderson County line. The roadway travels north to an intersection with US 175 near LaRue.

The current RM 2588 was designated on January 12, 1961.

FM 2588

A previous route designated Farm to Market Road 2588 (FM 2588) was located in Lipscomb County. It was established on November 24, 1959, from SH 305 near Lipscomb, westward . The route was cancelled on December 5, 1960, and its mileage was transferred to FM 1920.

FM 2589

FM 2590

FM 2591

Farm to Market Road 2591 (FM 2591) passes through Blanco Canyon in Crosby County.

FM 2591 was designated on November 24, 1959, on its current route.

FM 2592

RM 2593

Ranch to Market Road 2593 (RM 2593) is located in northern Pecos County.

The route proceeds north following the eastern shore of Imperial Reservoir. It then curves to the northwest along the northern shore of the reservoir and continues on a path parallel to the nearby Pecos River.

RM 2593 was designated  on November 24, 1959, along its current route.

RM 2594

FM 2595

RM 2596

RM 2597

FM 2598

FM 2599

Notes

References

+25
Farm to market roads 2500
Farm to Market Roads 2500